Historic Town Conservation Zone of Vientiane, the capital city of Laos, is an historic area which was designated 2002 for the conservation of the old heritage in the downtown area of Vientiane.

The area includes old temples and stupas. Originally those were in the inner wall of the capital.

History of Vientiane
Tourist attractions in Vientiane
Architectural conservation